Junction Independent School District is a public school district based in Junction, Texas (USA).

Schools
Junction High School
Junction Middle School
Junction Elementary School

In 2009, the school district was rated "academically acceptable" by the Texas Education Agency.

References

External links
Junction ISD

School districts in Kimble County, Texas